The men's individual time trial was a road bicycle racing event held as part of the cycling at the 1912 Summer Olympics programme. It was the first appearance of the event. The competition was held on Sunday July 7, 1912. The course was 320 kilometers (198.8 miles) long and the cyclists started at two minute interval.

123 cyclists from 16 nations competed.

Results of this race were used to determine the medals for the 
team time trial as well.

Results

References

 

Cycling at the 1912 Summer Olympics
Road cycling at the 1912 Summer Olympics
Cycling at the Summer Olympics – Men's individual time trial